The following television stations operate on virtual channel 9 in Mexico:

Nu9ve stations

35 stations on channel 9 carry Nu9ve programming.

Other local stations
CORTV in the state of Oaxaca
XHUJED-TDT in Durango, Durango
XHSLS-TDT in San Luis Potosí, San Luis Potosí
XERV-TDT in Reynosa, Tamaulipas

09 virtual